Cyclohexenone is an organic compound which is a versatile intermediate used in the synthesis of a variety of chemical products such as pharmaceuticals and fragrances. It is colorless liquid, but commercial samples are often yellow.

Industrially, cyclohexenone is prepared from phenol by Birch reduction.

Cyclohexenone is a ketone, or more precisely an enone. Common reactions include nucleophilic conjugate addition with organocopper reagents,  Michael reactions and Robinson annulations.

Synthesis
Several routes exist for the production of cyclohexenone. For the laboratory scale, it can be produced from resorcinol via 1,3-cyclohexanedione.

Cyclohexenone is obtained by Birch reduction of anisole followed by acid hydrolysis.

It can be obtained from cyclohexanone by α-bromination followed by treatment with base. Hydrolysis of 3-chloro cyclohexene followed by oxidation of the cyclohexenol is yet another route.

Cyclohexenone is produced industrially by catalytic oxidation of cyclohexene, for example with hydrogen peroxide and vanadium catalysts. Several patents describe diverse oxidizing agents and catalysts.

Reactions
Cyclohexenone is a widely used building block in organic synthesis chemistry, as it offers many different ways to extend molecular frameworks. 

As an enone, cyclohexenone is easily adapted to Michael addition with nucleophiles (such as enolates or silyl enol ethers) or, it could be employed by a Diels-Alder reaction with electron-rich dienes. Furthermore, this compound reacts with organocopper compounds from 1,4-addition (Michael addition), or with Grignard reagents 1,2-addition, i.e., with attack of the nucleophile at the carbonyl carbon atom. Cyclohexenone is also used in multi-step synthesis in the construction of polycyclic natural products. It is prochiral.

With strong bases, the positions 4 and 6 (the two CH2-groups of the carbonyl group and the C-C double bond adjacent) are deprotonated.

Cyclohexenone is an in-vitro catalyst for a relatively mild decarboxylation of alpha amino acids.

References

Enones
Reagents for organic chemistry
Cyclohexenes